The 34th National Basketball Association All-Star Game was played on January 29, 1984, at McNichols Sports Arena in Denver.  The East All-Stars defeated the West All-Stars. 154–145.  Isiah Thomas of the Detroit Pistons was named the MVP of the game.  As of 2021, this is the most recent NBA All-Star Game played during the month of January.

Rosters

DNPMoses Malone was unable to participate due to injury. Bill Laimbeer was named as his replacement.
STEastern Conference head coach K.C. Jones chose Robert Parish to start in place of the injured Malone.

Score by quarter
 

Halftime— West, 76-62
Third Quarter— West, 107-99

Slam Dunk Contest
Larry Nance won the first NBA Slam Dunk Contest.

NBA All-Star Legends Game
1984 also saw the return of the Legends Game after a 20-year absence.
In the East squad it featured the likes of Pete Maravich, Oscar Robertson, Sam Jones, John Havlicek, Dave DeBusschere, Nate Thurmond, Zelmo Beaty, Wes Unseld, Bill Sharman, Tom Heinsohn and Dick McGuire.
In the West squad it featured the likes of Rick Barry, Lou Hudson, Earl Monroe, Hal Greer, Bob Pettit, Jerry West, Connie Hawkins, Dolph Schayes, Johnny "Red" Kerr, and Dave Bing.

National Basketball Association All-Star Game
All-Star
NBA All-Star